The 2012–13 New Mexico State Aggies men's basketball team represented New Mexico State University during the 2012–13 NCAA Division I men's basketball season. The Aggies, led by sixth year head coach Marvin Menzies, played their home games at the Pan American Center and were members of the Western Athletic Conference. They finished the season 24–11, 14–4 in WAC play to finish in third place. They were champions of the WAC tournament to earn the conferences automatic bid to the NCAA tournament where they lost in the second round to Saint Louis.

Previous season 
The Aggies finished the season 26–10, 10–4 in WAC play to finish in second place. They were champions of the WAC tournament to earn an automatic bid to the NCAA tournament. In their 20th NCAA Tournament appearance, they lost in the second round to Indiana.

Departures

Incoming Transfers

2012 Recruiting Class

Roster

Schedule

|-
!colspan=9 style=| Exhibition

|-
!colspan=9 style=| Regular season

|-
!colspan=9 style=|2013 WAC Men's Basketball Tournament

|-
!colspan=9 style=|2013 NCAA Tournament

References

New Mexico State Aggies men's basketball seasons
New Mexico State
New Mexico State
Aggies
Aggies